DXKT (1071 AM) Radyo Ronda is a radio station owned and operated by the Radio Philippines Network. The station's studio and offices is located at Door 3, Second Floor, GRI Business Center, Kilometer 14, Barangay Panacan, and its transmitter is located at Bonofly Purok 4, Kilometer 24, Barangay Bunawan, Davao City.

References

Radio Philippines Network
RPN News and Public Affairs
Radio stations in Davao City
Radio stations established in 1961
News and talk radio stations in the Philippines
Television channels and stations established in 1961